A parlay, accumulator (or acca), combo bet or multi is a single bet that links together two or more individual wagers and is dependent on all of those wagers winning together. The benefit of the parlay is that there are much higher pay-offs than placing each individual bet separately since the likelihood of hitting all of them at once is much less. If any of the bets in the parlay lose, the entire parlay loses. If any of the plays in the parlay ties, or "pushes", the parlay reverts to a lower number of teams with the odds reducing accordingly.

Although a variety of bets can be used to build a parlay bet, correlated parlays are usually not allowed at betting sites. Correlated parlays are two or more bets from the same game that rely on a closely related outcome. Sportsbooks restrict this action because closely related bets can lead to bigger payouts in the chance of a win, which means a more substantial loss for the sportsbook.

Odds and payout
Parlay bets are paid out at odds higher than the typical single game bet, but still below the "true" odds. For instance, a common 2-team NFL parlay based entirely on the spread generally has a payout of 2.6:1. In reality, however, if one assumes that each single game bet is 50/50, the true payout should instead be 3:1 (10% expected value for the house). A house may average 20-30% profit on spread parlays compared to perhaps 4.5% profit on individual sports mix parlay bets.

Aside from "spread" parlays, another way to parlay is to bet on two or more teams simply winning straight up. In order to calculate the payout of this parlay, one must multiply out the payout for all games. For example, if 3 teams are -385 favorites, a successful parlay on all 3 teams winning would pay out at a ratio of approximately 1/1. This is because (385/485)^3 is approximately 50%.

Examples

Typical payouts for up to 10 team parlay bet
The following is an example of a traditional Las Vegas Parlay Card, which shows the typical payouts for an up to 10 team parlay bet based on −110 prices (amount won is assuming $100 is bet):

Profitability of parlays in sports betting
Many gamblers have mixed feelings as to whether or not parlays are a wise play. The best way to analyze if they are profitable in the long term is by calculating the expected value. The formula for expected value is:  . Since the probability of all possible events will add up to 1 this can also be looked at as the weighted average of the event. The table below represents odds.

Column 1 = number of individual bets in the parlay

Column 2 = correct odds of winning with 50% chance of winning each individual bet

Column 3 = odds payout of parlay at the sportsbook

Column 4 = correct odds of winning parlay with 55% chance of winning each individual bet

The table illustrates that if a 55% chance of winning each individual bet were achievable, parlays would be profitable in the long term. Compare the expected value received on an individual bet at a typical price of −110 with a 55% chance of winning: ((100/110+1)*.55)−1 = .05 (exactly 5 cents won for every dollar bet on average), multiplied by 11 = .55, to the expected return on the 11 game parlay ((1234/717.8)−1) = .719 (72 cents won for every dollar bet on average).  In this case a parlay has a much higher expected value than individual bets with greatly increased variance in outcomes.

See also
Full cover bet
Trixie (bet)
Each-Way (bet)
Progressive parlay

References

Wagering
Sports betting